The Moncouche River (French: rivière Moncouche) is a tributary of the east bank of the Métabetchouane River, crossing the Laurentides Wildlife Reserve, flowing in the province from Quebec, to Canada. The course of this river crosses the:
unorganized territory of Belle-Rivière, in the Lac-Saint-Jean-Est Regional County Municipality, in the administrative region of Saguenay–Lac-Saint-Jean;
unorganized territory of Lac-Jacques-Cartier, in the MRC of La Côte-de-Beaupré Regional County Municipality, in the administrative region of Capitale-Nationale.

Forestry is the main economic activity in this valley; recreational tourism, second.

The surface of the Moncouche River (except the rapids zones) is usually frozen from the end of November to the beginning of April, however the safe circulation on the ice is generally done from mid-December to the end of March.

Geography 
The main watersheds near the Moncouche river are:
north side: Métabetchouane River, Huard lake and rivière à la Carpe;
east side: rivière aux Écorces, rivière aux Montagnais, ruisseau Contourné;
south side: Métabetchouane River;
west side: Métabetchouane River, Métabetchouane Lake.

The Moncouche River rises at the mouth of Starr Lake. This misshapen lake looks like a big X or a star; it has two large bays to the north, two in the center and two to the south.

 southward, to the northeast shore of Saint-Véran Lake;
 to the southwest crossing Saint-Véran over its full length;
 to the southwest crossing Moncouche Lake over its full length. Note: Saint-Véran Lake and Moncouche Lake are interconnected, thus providing  for pleasure boating.
 to the south, until the confluence of the rivière aux Montagnais (coming from the east);
 to the southwest, in particular by bypassing an island and crossing Lake Méandre, until it meets the Métabetchouane River.

Toponymy 
The toponym "rivière Moncouche" was formalized on December 5, 1968, at the Place Names Bank of the Commission de toponymie du Québec.

Notes and references

See also 
 Belle-Rivière, an unorganized territory.
 Lac-Saint-Jean-Est Regional County Municipality
 Lac-Jacques-Cartier, an unorganized territory.
 La Côte-de-Beaupré Regional County Municipality
 Laurentides Wildlife Reserve
 Rivière aux Montagnais
 Métabetchouane River
 Lac Saint-Jean, a body of water
 Saguenay River
 St. Lawrence River
 List of rivers of Quebec

Rivers of Saguenay–Lac-Saint-Jean
Rivers of Capitale-Nationale
Lac-Saint-Jean-Est Regional County Municipality
La Côte-de-Beaupré Regional County Municipality